The Deilenaar is a breed of rabbit from the Netherlands. It is a rare variety (Fur Section) in the UK.

It is recognised by the British Rabbit Council, but not by the American Rabbit Breeders' Association.

See also
List of rabbit breeds

References

Rabbit breeds originating in the Netherlands